Kings Gap is a valley located in Harris County, Georgia, United States. The valley is found between the cities of Pine Mountain and Shiloh.

Kings Gap was named after a rural trader surnamed King who operated in the area.

References

Landforms of Harris County, Georgia
Valleys of Georgia (U.S. state)